Boser is a surname. Notable people with the surname include:

Friedrich Boser (1811–1881), German artist
Tanner Boser (born 1991), Canadian mixed martial arts fighter

See also
Buser